The 2021 European U23 Wrestling Championships was the 6th edition of European U23 Wrestling Championships of combined events, and took place from May 17 to 23 in Skopje, North Macedonia.

Medal table

Team ranking

Medal summary

Men's freestyle

Men's Greco-Roman

Women's freestyle

References

External links 

Wrestling
European Wrestling U23 Championships
Sports competitions in Skopje
European Wrestling U23 Championships
European Wrestling U23 Championships